Halsafjord or  Halsafjorden is a fjord located between Heim Municipality (in Trøndelag county) and Tingvoll Municipality (in Møre og Romsdal county), Norway.

The European route E39 highway crosses the fjord by a car ferry from Kanestraum in Tingvoll to Halsanaustan in Heim. Investigations are made regarding a bridge over the fjord.

See also
 List of Norwegian fjords

References

Fjords of Møre og Romsdal
Fjords of Trøndelag
Tingvoll
Heim, Norway
Proposed bridges in Norway